Akasaki Station is the name of two train stations in Japan:

 Akasaki Station (Iwate); see List of railway stations in Japan: A
 Akasaki Station (Tottori)